Kentucky Route 595 is a north- south route running through Madison County, Kentucky, United States. Its northern terminus is at the Kentucky River near Valley View and it southern terminus is at the intersection of Kentucky Route 1617 2 miles south of Berea. From the northern terminus to its intersection with Kentucky Route 876 it follows Silver Creek.

Route description
From the intersection with Kentucky Route 876 it passes through the communities of Round Hill and Kirksville. Four miles south of Kirksville its meets up with Kentucky Route 52 for a mile east until Happy Landing and then it turns towards Berea going through Buggytown along the way. Upon entering Berea it intersects with Interstate 75, then intersects with Kentucky Route 956 (Berea Bypass) and Mayde Road. Kentucky Route 595 turns at the light onto Walnut Meadow Pike on into Berea, passing by the Artisan Center and Berea Community Schools and though Berea. At the center of Berea it meets with US Route 25 and Kentucky Route 21. After that, it becomes Scaffald Cane Road and runs two more miles before ending at Kentucky Route 1617. Kentucky Route 1617 maintains Scaffald Cane Road until its end with US Route 25 in Rockcastle County. Future extensions are aspired and KYTC will expand it to freeway and end somewhere and turn and overlap with other highways and have exits and intersections from its current end.

Major intersections

References

External links
 Kentucky Roads - KY 595

0595
Transportation in Madison County, Kentucky